Verrall is a surname. Notable people with the surname include:

Arthur Woollgar Verrall, classical scholar
Margaret Verrall, English parapsychologist
Pamela Motley Verrall (1915-1996) Welsh composer
Richard Verrall, British politician 
Richard Verrall (academic), British actuarial scientist 
George Henry Verrall, British horse racing official, entomologist, botanist, and Conservative politician